Yeşilyurt Village Mosque is a historical mosque built in the Ottoman period (1900s). The mosque located in Yeşilyurt Village of Ayvacık district of Çanakkale province.

At the entrance of the mosque, there is the date of 1322 Hijri. Due to the work of Greeks during the construction of the mosque and the influence of their culture, the architectural type of the mosque is reminiscent of the church. There are star and crescent motifs inside the building.

References 

Infobox mapframe without OSM relation ID on Wikidata
Mosques in Turkey
Ottoman mosques in Turkey